Mitagi-Kazmalyar (Mitəhi-Qazmalar) is a rural locality (a selo) in Derbentsky District, Republic of Dagestan, Russia. The population was 1,176 as of 2010. There are 49 streets.

Geography 
Mitagi-Kazmalyar is located 16 km west of Derbent (the district's administrative centre) by road. Mitagi and Mugarty are the nearest rural localities.

Nationalities 
Azerbaijanis live there.

References 

Rural localities in Derbentsky District